Leandro N. Alem is a department of the province of Misiones (Argentina).

References 

Departments of Misiones Province